The Notch of Rivinus is a small defect in the posterior edge of the bony annular tympanic ring. The defect is located just superior to the tympano-mastoid suture line in the posterior ear canal. Following identification of the spine of Henle it is possible to follow the tympano-mastoid suture line medially towards the annular ring.  At this location the Chorda Tympani Nerve is often identified.  Just superior to this the Notch of Rivinus can be seen and the neck of the malleus occupies the notch and often is the superior limit of a tympanomeatal flap.

Etymology: Augustus Q. Rivinus, German anatomist, 1652–1723
a deficiency in the tympanic sulcus of the ear that forms an attachment for the flaccid part of the tympanic membrane and the mallear folds. Also called Rivinus' incisure, tympanic incisure.

Ear